Rhaphiptera triangulifera is a species of beetle in the family Cerambycidae. It was described by Lane in 1974. It is known from Brazil.

References

triangulifera
Beetles described in 1974